Holy Trinity Church, Dover was a church designed by William Edmunds. Building of the church began in September 1833 and it was completed in 1835. It was demolished after being damaged during World War II.

References

Church of England church buildings in Kent
Dover, Kent
Churches completed in 1835
Buildings and structures in the United Kingdom destroyed during World War II
19th-century Church of England church buildings